Solna Church  is a so-called round church in Solna Municipality near Stockholm, Sweden. The church is located on the headland between Brunnsviken and Ulvsundasjön, at the southern end of the cemetery Norra begravningsplatsen. The oldest parts of the church are from the later 12th century, a Romanesque fortress church built in stone.

Today the church consists of a roundhouse, weaponhouse, choir, nave, sacristy, and two grave choirs.

Church buildings

The oldest part of the church, the roundhouse, originates from the late 12th century, and was especially built for defense purposes. Attached to this round center is a weaponhouse (south), a rectangular choir to the east, and a rectangular nave to the west. North of the choir is the sacristy, and to the east an octagonal grave choir. There is a second grave choir on the south side of the nave. The roundhouse (central tower) is covered by a tall cupola, which dominates the appearance of the church. The choir was added in the 13th century. The oldest part of the nave is from the 14th century, and was extended during the 15th century, when the weaponhouse and sacristy were built.

Decorations

The church achieved large parts of its interior under the patronage of Magnus Gabriel de la Gardie. In 1674 the western portal was added, a sculptured portal originally constructed for Karlbergs slott in 1637, and moved to Solna church in 1674. In 1708 Queen Ulrika Eleonora commissioned a grave choir dedicated to count Tomas Polus. The roof was destroyed in a fire in 1723, and the current cupola was built after this incident. The Lange grave choir was constructed in the 1780s. In 1883 the church was given a roof of copper plates.

A major restoration took place in 1928 under supervision of architect Erik Fant, when the church's medieval paintings were recovered. The medieval murals from ca. 1440 are attributed to Albertus Pictor.

The choir is dominated by the altar centre-piece, sculpted in wood in 1666 by Hans Jerling. The centre-piece frames two oil paintings with biblical motifs, and is crowned by a wood-sculptured Madonna from the late 16th century, while the altar is made of brick and covered by a limestone plate.

Literary reference
Solna Church is mentioned in Carl Michael Bellman's song "Haga" (Fredmans Sånger No. 64).

Other round churches
Other Swedish round churches are Bromma Church, Munsö Church, Voxtorps Church, Hagby Church,  Valleberga Church, Skörstorps Church and Vårdsbergs Church.

See also 
 Ulriksdal Palace
 List of churches in Stockholm

References

12th-century churches in Sweden
Church frescos in Sweden
Buildings and structures in Stockholm County
Fortified church buildings
Churches in the Diocese of Stockholm (Church of Sweden)
Churches converted from the Roman Catholic Church to the Church of Sweden